The Whitefish Range is a mountain range stretching north-south from British Columbia, Canada to Montana, United States. Water flowing from its east side drains down the North Fork Flathead River and its west side drains into the Whitefish River, both part of the Columbia River drainage basin.

The mountain range is located north of Columbia Falls and Whitefish in the Flathead Valley, and east of Eureka. The Flathead River separates it from the Swan Range, which would otherwise continue the mountain range southwards.

The Whitefish Range, however, is not particularly high. The highest peaks in the U.S. are Nasukoin Mountain, and Lake Mountain, . In Canada, the highest peak is Mount Doupe, .

The Whitefish Range is located west of Glacier National Park and consists mostly of wilderness. It supports a variety of conifers including western red cedar,  Douglas fir, lodgepole pine and western larch, but much of the region has been devastated by forest fires.  The area also supports large mammals including black bears, grizzly bears, mountain lions, and other species of fish, small mammals, and amphibians.

In the U.S., a large portion of the range has been removed from multiple use designation, including the 34,000-acre Ten Lakes Wilderness Study Area on the Kootenai National Forest. Ten Lakes WSA contains more than 89 miles of trails, many mountain lakes,  
alpine peaks, and views into Canada and Glacier National Park.

See also
List of mountain ranges in Montana

Notes

Mountain ranges of Montana
Mountain ranges of British Columbia
Landforms of Flathead County, Montana